Barbours Creek Wilderness is a U.S. wilderness area in the Eastern Divide Ranger District of George Washington and Jefferson National Forests of western Virginia, United States.

The area is part of the Barbours Creek-Shawvers Run Cluster.

Location and access
Located about five miles north of New Castle, Virginia, the wilderness is bounded on the west by the crest of Potts Mountain, on the east by Barbour’s Creek and Va 617, and on the south by Forest Service Road 176.

The only maintained trail in the area, Lipes Branch Trail,  follows  along Lipes  Branch for 1.7 miles with a trailhead near the Pines Campground.
The hike along Lipes Branch Trail can be extended to a total of 2.3 miles by continuing along Lipes Branch beyond the maintained section of Lipes Branch Trail, continuing to the Potts Mountain Jeep Trail, and turning left onto the jeep  trail to reach the next knob with a rock outcrop on the right.

Another view of the wilderness is gained by hiking  along the Potts Mountain Jeep Trail beginning at trailheads on either FS 176 or Va 617.  The 7.3 mile jeep trail is  not in the wilderness, but directly next to the wilderness forming the western boundary.

Natural history
There are two major types of forests in the wilderness, a forest with northern red oak, hickory, birch and some mountain ash along the drier slopes at the top of the mountain, and another with white pine, hemlock and white oak in moist areas along Barbours Creek and some mountain hollows.
In April, 2012, a wind-swept fire, originating on the Potts Mountain Jeep Trail, burned a large section of the wilderness, destroying the canopy along the tops of side-ridges and leaving scarred trees still present today.

Potts Pond, a site identified by the Virginia Natural Heritage Program, contains sphagnum moss, ferns, insectivorous plants and other rare plants.  The amber-winged spreadwing, a rare damsel fly, is found here, as well as the federally endangered northeastern bulrush.

With the adjacent National Forest, the area is a good habitat for black bears who thrive in the wilderness, for birds with about 160 species of birds having been found, and bobcats, with one of the largest concentrations of bobcats in Virginia.

Topography
Potts Mountain, with a maximum elevation of 3169 feet, is  part of the Ridge and Valley System  that extends in a northwesterly direction along the border of Virginia and West Virginia.

The wilderness falls on the eastern slope of Potts Mountain, adjacent to the Shawvers Run Wilderness on the western slope.  The  wilderness area rises from 1700 feet  at the lower creeks to 3800 feet on the mountain.

There is a bald of about fifty acres in size, just outside the western boundary, on the top of Potts Mountain with extensive views.

Barbours Creek, for which the wilderness is named, passes the wilderness flowing southeast,  and curls around Bald Mountain to join Craig Creek, which then flows into the James River.  The creek is designated by the Virginia Department of Game and Inland Fisheries as a cold water stream.  Lipes Branch, also a cold water stream, flows down Potts Mountain into Barbours Creek. Another stream to the south flows through a narrow canyon formed by an interesting rock formation.

See also
Barbours Creek-Shawvers Run Cluster

References

External links
Wilderness Connect
Natural Atlas
Trails

George Washington and Jefferson National Forests
IUCN Category Ib
Protected areas of Craig County, Virginia
Wilderness areas of Virginia
Protected areas established in 1988
1988 establishments in Virginia